Rupert Scotland (2 September 1937 – 7 June 2012) was an Antiguan-born Bermudian cricketer. He was a right-handed batsman and a right-arm medium pace bowler.

He played the inaugural first-class match for the Leeward Islands, against Jamaica in 1958, and later played in the inaugural first-class match for Bermuda, against New Zealand in 1972. It was the maiden first-class match to be played by the Bermuda cricket team.

He died following a long illness on 7 June 2012. His son Cleon Scotland played List A cricket for Bermuda.

References

External links
Cricket Archive profile
Cricinfo profile

1937 births
2012 deaths
Bermudian cricketers
Antigua and Barbuda cricketers
Leeward Islands cricketers
Antigua and Barbuda emigrants to Bermuda